The 1983 South African motorcycle Grand Prix was the first round of the FIM 1983 Grand Prix motorcycle racing season. It took place on the weekend of 18–19 March 1983 at the Kyalami circuit which, has an elevation of 6,000 feet above sea level. It was the first Grand Prix motorcycle race held on the African continent. Because of the cost of flying Grand Prix teams and their equipment to South Africa, organizers were allowed to run just two classes rather than the three normally required by the FIM.

Summary

Qualifying
Qualifying was led by Honda's Freddie Spencer with Eddie Lawson, Takazumi Katayama, Kenny Roberts, Ron Haslam, Marco Lucchinelli and Franco Uncini filling out the front row of the starting grid.

Race
The race started with the four factory-backed Hondas leading the field with Spencer out in front. Suzuki's Randy Mamola was in fifth with Roberts closing in on the leaders. Despite an overheating motorcycle, Roberts managed to secure second place on the ninth lap when he passed Haslam but, by then Spencer had built a 10 second lead. Roberts was able to close the gap to 5 seconds but, his overheating engine prevented him from gaining any further time and he had to settle for second place behind race winner Spencer. Haslam battled Yamaha's Marc Fontan to secure third place. Katayama had made a poor tire choice and when he tried to increase his pace late in the race, he crashed while trying to pass Jon Ekerold's Cagiva. Katayama's crash promoted Mamola to fifth place.

Jean-François Baldé led teammate Didier de Radiguès across the finish line to post an impressive one-two finish in the 250cc race for Alain Chevallier's privateer Yamaha team.

Classification

500 cc

References

South African motorcycle Grand Prix
South African
Motorcycle Grand Prix
March 1983 sports events in Africa